Pons is a lunar impact crater that is located to the west of the prominent Rupes Altai scarp. It was named after French astronomer Jean-Louis Pons. It lies to the southeast of the crater Sacrobosco, and southwest of Polybius. To the northwest along the same flank of the formation is the crater Fermat.

The rim of Pons is somewhat elongated in shape, being longer along a northeast–southwest axis than in the perpendicular direction. The outer wall is irregular and notched, particularly at the northeastern end where it is partly overlain by the satellite crater Pons D and multiple smaller formations. The interior is uneven, with low ridges projecting from the north and southeastern rims.

Satellite craters
By convention these features are identified on lunar maps by placing the letter on the side of the crater midpoint that is closest to Pons.

References

 
 
 
 
 
 
 
 
 
 
 

Impact craters on the Moon